Dahira marisae is a moth of the  family Sphingidae. It is known from Bhutan.

References

Dahira
Moths described in 2009